The Rio Tinto Boron Mine (formerly  the U.S. Borax Boron Mine)  in Boron, California is California's largest open-pit mine and the largest borax mine in the world, producing nearly half the world's borates.  Ore reserves are sufficient for production through at least 2050. It is operated by the Borax division of the Rio Tinto Group.

History
The borax deposit here was discovered in 1913, by John K. Suckow, who when drilling for water found a deposit of what he believed to be gypsum. Further testing revealed it was the colemanite form of borax.  Francis Marion "Borax" Smith bought the claim for his Pacific Coast Borax Company.  Mining at the site by shafts began in the 1920s.  Pacific Coast Borax later became U.S. Borax, which subsequently opened the current open-pit mine in 1957.  U.S. Borax was later acquired by Rio Tinto Group, which continues to operate the mine.

A pilot project to produce lithium by sifting through mining waste began in 2019.

Borax Visitor Center
The mine's Borax Visitor Center, which includes a museum, historic mining artifacts, and a mine overlook, is open to the public.

References

External links
Mindat.org— Boron Mine, Kramer Borate Mining District (U.S. Borax open pit) — history, geology, and minerals list/links.
Borax Visitor Center
Placesearth.com: gallery of Borax Visitor Center photos 

Borax mines
Companies based in Kern County, California
Geography of Kern County, California
Mines in California
Mining museums in California
Mojave Desert
Museums in Kern County, California
Open-pit mines
Borax Mine
Surface mines in the United States
Tourist attractions in Kern County, California